The 2019 Metro Manila Film Festival (MMFF) is the 45th edition of the annual Metro Manila Film Festival held in Metro Manila and throughout the Philippines. It is organized by the Metropolitan Manila Development Authority (MMDA). During the festival, no foreign films are shown in Philippine theaters (except IMAX and 4D theaters).

Entries

Feature films

The Metro Manila Film Festival (MMFF) Executive Committee announced four of the eight official entries in July 2019. The first four films were selected based from the scripts submitted until May 31, 2019.

Kampon was originally one of first four entries but was disqualified due to the late filing of its producers for a change in its leading actor after Derek Ramsay withdrew from the project. Kampon was replaced by Sunod which was the next in line entry for the horror genre.

Short films
A short film competition for students was organized as part of the film festival. A total of 16 short films were considered as semi-finalists with eight of them selected as the final entries. Each short film has a running time of 3–5 minutes and showcase the theme "Philippine Mythology and Regional Stories (Myths, Legends, & Folktales)".  The eight selected short films were screened alongside the official eight full-length films during the whole official run of the film festival.

Parade of Stars
The traditional Parade of Stars which featured floats of the film festival's eight entries took place on December 22, 2019, in Taguig.

The route passed through the M. L. Quezon Avenue, MRT Avenue, C5 Road before entering the McKinley Hill through Upper McKinley Road. Then the parade passed through McKinley Parkway, 32nd Street, 7th Avenue, 28th Avenue, 5th Avenue, Lawton Avenue, LeGrand Avenue and Chateau Road. The Best Float accolade is awarded in the same day of the parade. Temporary closures were implemented on select roads at the day of the parade from noon to 7 p.m.
700 to 1000 police officers were also deployed by the National Capital Region Police Office and 1,250 personnel by the Metropolitan Manila Development Authority to secure the parade.

Vice Ganda arrived late to the parade for the float of The Mall, The Merrier due to live guesting conflict with ASAP Natin 'To at ABS-CBN Broadcasting Center in Quezon City.

Awards

The Gabi ng Parangal of the 2019 Metro Manila Film Festival was held on December 27, 2019
 at the New Frontier Theater in Quezon City. The awards night was hosted by Marco Gumabao and Bela Padilla.

The Board of Jurors in this year's edition consisted of Chairman Karlo Alexi Nograles, Co-chairman Senator Bong Go, Vice-chairman Arsenio Lizaso, plus Jury Members Vilma Santos-Recto, Rachel Arenas, Joel Lamangan, Joey Javier Reyes, Christopher de Leon, Belinda Enriquez, Dr. Corazon Bautista-Cruz, Romy Vitug, Nonong Buencamino and Fr. Larry Faraon.  
The MMFF Hall of Fame Awards were also held as part of the larger Gabi ng Parangal that gave recognition to past award recipients who have been awarded three or more times in the same category in the past editions of the Gabi ng Parangal.

Major awards
Winners are listed first, highlighted in boldface, and indicated with a double dagger. Nominations are also listed if applicable.

Special Awards

Metro Manila Film Festival Stalwarts
 Marichu Perez-Maceda
 Boots Anson-Rodrigo
 Bienvenido Lumbera
 Joseph Estrada

Metro Manila Film Festival Hall of Fame

Other awards
Scratch-it Lucky Male Star of the Night – Aga Muhlach
Scratch-it Lucky Female Star of the Night – Carmina Villaroel

Short Film category
Best Student Short Film – Pamana ni Lola from Polytechnic University of the Philippines, Sta. Mesa
Special Jury Prize – Gold, Silver, Bronze at Anting-Anting from DLSU Integrated School, Manila

Multiple awards

Multiple nominations

Box office gross
The eight entries of 2019 Metro Manila Film Festival made a combined box office gross of  during the official run of the film festival. The top four grossing films in no particular order was also released namely: 3pol Trobol: Huli Ka Balbon!,  The Mall, the Merrier, Miracle in Cell No. 7,, and Mission Unstapabol: The Don Identity. The box office figures for the top four team was eventually announced.

References

Metro Manila Film Festival
MMFF
MMFF
MMFF
MMFF
MMFF
December 2019 events in the Philippines
January 2020 events in the Philippines